The Maha Mudaliyar ( Head Mudaliyar  or මහ මුදලි) was a colonial title and office in Ceylon (now Sri Lanka). Head Mudaliyar functioned as the head of the low country native headmen and native aide-de-camp to the Governor of Ceylon.

As the native headmen system became an integral part of the administration of the island under the successive European colonial powers, namely the Portuguese Empire, the Dutch East India Company and the British Empire; the colonial governors appointed a Head Mudaliyar from among the many mudaliyars. As with the role of headmen changed over the years functioning in military, policing, administrative and ceremonial capacities, the role of the Head Mudaliyar too evolved into a permanent position in the staff of the Governor. He would serve as personal translator and adviser to the Governor on native matters. Head Mudaliyar would stand behind the Governor on all state occasions, all ways standing in the presence of the Governor. He would wear a unique uniform which followed the lines of a Mudaliyar uniform and cocked hat. The last holder of the post was Sir James Peter Obeyesekere II, who held office from 1928 until his death in 1968 with no new head mudaliyars appointed thereafter.

List of Head Mudaliyars

Don Samarakone Fernando (Chevalier) - Head Mudaliyar of Portuguese Ceylon
Nicholas Dias Abeyesinghe Amarasekere (1719-1794)- Head Mudaliyar of Dutch Ceylon
Johannes de Saram Wijayasekara Abayarathne
Adrian de Abrew Rajapakse
Joan Ilangakoon
Christoffel de Saram Wanigasekera Ekanaike
Don David Jayathilake Abeysiriwardhana Ilangakoon 
Lambertus Obeyesekere 
Julius Valentine de Saram
Don Abraham Wijesinghe Jayewardene (1801-1866)
Conrad Pieter Dias Wijewardena Bandaranaike  (18??–1895) 
Sir Solomon Dias Bandaranike (1895–1928) 
Sir James Peter Obeyesekere II (1928–1968)

See also
Native headmen of Ceylon
Ceylonese Mudaliyars
Walauwa
Kastane
Adigar

References

 
 

Titles in British Ceylon
Defunct government positions in Sri Lanka